Suvanto may refer to:
 Suvanto, Finnish name for Lake Sukhodolskoye
 1927 Suvanto, stony Eunomian asteroid from the central region of the asteroid belt
 David Suvanto, Swedish ice hockey player